Matthew Fox is a Canadian author and magazine editor, known for his expertise in online publishing and social media.

Early life and education

Fox studied creative writing at both Concordia University and The New School. In 2005, he authored Cities of Weather, a collection of short stories. Quill & Quire magazine, in a review by Robert Wiersema, described the book as "a promising foray into the short fiction arena." When interviewed by Books in Canada magazine, Fox described his literary influences as Lorrie Moore, Alice Munro, Leonard Cohen, Mavis Gallant, Guy de Maupassant, J.M. Coetzee and Anton Chekhov.

Career

From 2003 to 2006, Fox worked at Maisonneuve magazine in Montreal as a fiction and associate editor. He subsequently moved to Toronto and joined the staff of Toronto Life magazine as online editor. With the exception of a short sabbatical, he remained with the publication for eight years.

Under his leadership, the magazine dramatically expanded its online reach. In October 2009, Torontolife.com was awarded "Best overall magazine website" at the inaugural Canadian Online Publishing Awards. The same month, Toronto Life announced that under Fox's direction, online readership had grown by 90,000 unique visitors to a monthly average of more than 300,000 readers.

References 

Concordia University alumni
Canadian male short story writers
Canadian magazine editors
Canadian gay writers
Living people
21st-century Canadian short story writers
21st-century Canadian male writers
Year of birth missing (living people)
21st-century Canadian LGBT people